Velika Bukovica is a village southwest of Ilirska Bistrica in the Inner Carniola region of Slovenia.

Name
Velika Bukovica literally means 'big Bukovica', distinguishing the settlement from neighboring Mala Bukovica (literally, 'little Bukovica'). Bukovica is a common toponym and oronym in Slovenia. It is derived from the adjective bukov 'beech' (from bukev 'beech tree') and originally referred to the local vegetation. The Italian name of the settlement was Bucovizza Grande.

Church
The local church in the settlement is dedicated to Saints Cosmas and Damian and belongs to the Parish of Ilirska Bistrica.

References

External links
Velika Bukovica on Geopedia

Populated places in the Municipality of Ilirska Bistrica